Spergon Wynn III (born August 10, 1978) is a former gridiron football quarterback. He was drafted by the Cleveland Browns in the sixth round of the 2000 NFL Draft. He played college football at Southwest Texas State. Wynn also played for the Amsterdam Admirals, Minnesota Vikings, BC Lions, Winnipeg Blue Bombers and Toronto Argonauts.

College career
Wynn started his college career playing for the Minnesota Golden Gophers of the University of Minnesota, but he transferred to play quarterback for the Southwest Texas State Bobcats of Southwest Texas State University, now known as Texas State University, between 1998 and 1999. In these two years, Wynn piled up 3,497 yards passing, good for sixth on Southwest Texas State's record books. In 1998, Wynn threw for 1,851 yards and 10 touchdowns. In 1999, Wynn was selected to the All-Southland Conference second-team after throwing for 1646 yards and 14 touchdowns for the Bobcats.

Statistics

Professional career

Cleveland Browns
Wynn was drafted by the Cleveland Browns in the sixth round (183rd overall) in 2000. He was the sixth quarterback picked in that draft, although chosen before New England drafted Tom Brady. Wynn played for the Browns in 2000, seeing action in seven games, including one start – a 48–0 loss to the Jacksonville Jaguars. With the Browns, Wynn completed 22 of 54 (40.7%) passes for 167 yards, no touchdowns, one interception, and a passer rating of 41.2.

Amsterdam Admirals
In the summer of 2001, Wynn was sent to NFL Europe to develop his skills. He started for the Amsterdam Admirals, throwing 14 touchdowns and 2,039 yards.

Minnesota Vikings
On September 2, 2001, Wynn, along with running back Travis Prentice, was traded to the Minnesota Vikings in exchange for draft picks in the 2002 and 2003 drafts. Wynn was a third string backup to Daunte Culpepper and Todd Bouman in the 2001 and 2002 seasons and played in the last three games of the 2001 season, starting two of them because of season-ending injuries to both Culpepper and Bouman. In the Vikings’ next-to-last regular-season game against the Green Bay Packers on December 30, 2001, Wynn threw the only touchdown pass of his NFL career, a 47-yard strike to tight end Byron Chamberlain.

BC Lions
After failing to move beyond third string with the Vikings, Wynn made his way north to Canada to play for the BC Lions, completing 67 of 99 passes for 894 yards, 6 touchdowns, and one interception. He also rushed for 2 touchdowns and 145 yards on 36 attempts.

Winnipeg Blue Bombers
On April 13, 2005, Wynn was acquired by the Winnipeg Blue Bombers for a conditional pick in the 2006 CFL Draft.

Toronto Argonauts
Spergon Wynn was traded to the Toronto Argonauts on February 22, 2006 for safety Mike Crumb.

Career statistics

Personal life
Wynn is currently an energy broker with Amerex Energy Services in Houston, Texas. He has two sons, Spergon IV and Slaton.

References

External links
 
 
 
 

1978 births
Living people
American football quarterbacks
Canadian football quarterbacks
African-American players of American football
African-American players of Canadian football
Amsterdam Admirals players
BC Lions players
Cleveland Browns players
Minnesota Vikings players
Texas State Bobcats football players
Toronto Argonauts players
Winnipeg Blue Bombers players
Players of American football from Houston
Players of Canadian football from Houston
21st-century African-American sportspeople
20th-century African-American sportspeople
Minnesota Golden Gophers football players